BBC Radio Cambridgeshire is the BBC's local radio station serving the county of Cambridgeshire.

It broadcasts on FM, DAB, digital TV and via BBC Sounds from studios at the Cambridge Business Park on Cowley Road in Cambridge.

According to RAJAR, the station has a weekly audience of 77,000 listeners and a 5.4% share as of December 2022.

Original schedule 
Radio Cambridgeshire began broadcasting on 1 May 1982 and was originally known as Radio Cambridge and Radio Peterborough. It was originally based at studios on Hills Road, close to Cambridge railway station.

Under the first manager, Hal Bethell, Radio Cambridgeshire's early broadcasts were restricted to a few hours at breakfast and two hours in the afternoon.

The opening day was broadcast from Cambridge and all the district offices at Peterborough, Wisbech, March, Huntingdon and Ely. The first programme was presented by Gina Madgett (formerly Radio Nottingham) and the first record played on-air was Ebony and Ivory by Paul McCartney and Stevie Wonder.

The original weekday presenters were:
 Julian Dunne (New Day, an all-speech news service that ran at the same hours as Today on Radio 4, on which it was based)
 Anne Bristow and Jane Solomons, alternating (The Light Programme, a mixture of music and light interviews)
 Gina Madgett (The Home Service, a largely speech programme with interviews intended to interest listeners at home)

When Hal Bethell left the station for health reasons, he was replaced by the deputy manager of Radio Lincolnshire, Dave Wilkinson. He extended broadcasting into the afternoon by hiring Radio Lincolnshire presenter, John Richards. Wilkinson returned to Radio Lincolnshire as manager and was replaced by Ian Masters, ex-presenter of BBC East's regional TV news programme, Look East.

Peterborough studios 
The Peterborough studio opened in a single office in Broadway Court, rented from Peterborough Development Corporation, the body responsible for the city's expansion as a New Town. The broadcasting equipment was two Studer tape recorders, a four-channel mixer and two microphones, which were placed on a table surrounded by mobile sound baffles. Ian Cameron, the first Peterborough-based presenter, realised at the last moment that the wall behind the temporary studio abutted the office block's lavatories and asked the staff in Cambridge to listen while he flushed the cistern. Nothing could be heard and the broadcast went ahead without fear of others in the office block inadvertently disturbing it.

In 1983, Peterborough was equipped with its own studio, using a 12-channel Audix mixing desk made in the county and two Studer B67 tape machines, with a third machine for editing in a neighbouring office. That office later become a studio as well, although it could go on the air only from the main studio alongside. The first complete programme from Peterborough was presented by Julia Booth (formerly of BBC Radio London) while the studio's opening party was going on on the floor below.

In 1987, the studio gained the ability to broadcast localised opt-outs. At first, the opt-out was used only for traffic information in the morning news programme and, later in the day, for five-minute spots of purely local information. The first full opt-out programme from Peterborough was presented by Les Woodland in the afternoon while John Richards broadcast from Cambridge. Steve Somers presented the BBC Radio Peterborough daily Breakfast show. Production assistant for the opt-in station was Darren Deans. The next programme to opt out was Sounds Eastern, two hours of music and commentary aimed at Peterborough's Indian, Pakistani, Sikh and Bengali population and presented by Ansar Ali. The Peterborough Breakfast show opt out was abandoned in 2012 due to BBC cutbacks, and presenter Paul Stainton took over presenting duties of the countywide breakfast show, then the mid-morning show following Andy Harper's retirement in 2014, before leaving the station in September 2017.

The Peterborough studio has now closed after not being used for a couple of years.

Outside broadcasts 

The station's first outside broadcasts were of results from local elections held soon after the station went on the air. The station's radio car was used from the back doors of the town hall in Peterborough. The reporter was Ian Cameron. The first complete programme broadcast away from the studio was the same year, from the East of England Show in Peterborough, presented by Anne Bristow.

Remote studios 

Radio Cambridgeshire, when it opened, had satellite studios in Huntingdon, Ely and Wisbech, using offices in council buildings. The studios were equipped with a microphone and a small mixing desk and were used to save contributors a journey to Cambridge or to Peterborough.

Symbol 

The first station badge or symbol was a design suggesting Cambridgeshire's three main rivers, the Nene, the Ouse and the Cam. Before the station came on the air, the manager, Hal Bethell, arranged with the Pye radio company, which had long been associated with Cambridge, to use a design based on the sun-through-clouds design which Pye previously cut into the loudspeaker screens of its original radios.

The sun-and-clouds symbol remained until a BBC ruling that all its stations should have a joint logo to underline the national nature of the local service.

Transmitters 

BBC Radio  Cambridgeshire broadcasts on two FM frequencies, on 95.7FM from the Peterborough mast with a Cambridge relay on 96.0. 

On 30 October 2004, a fire broke out (thought to be arson) 80 ft up the main Peterborough mast, one mile west of Morborne, and the heat caused the whole mast to collapse. A shorter BT Group plc tower with microwave transmission dishes next to it was undamaged. The 95.7FM signal was put out of action for a few weeks.

The DAB signals come from two multiplexes in Cambridgeshire. As of 30 November 2002, the NOW Digital Peterborough 12D multiplex has come from Peterborough (main signal), plus Hinchingbrook Hospital (Huntingdon). A planned DAB transmitter for Stamford (in south Lincolnshire) was not launched for this multiplex for some years. NOW Peterborough covers Peterborough, Huntingdon, Stamford and Spalding.

Since 30 September 2004, the NOW Digital Cambridge 11C multiplex has come from Madingley. BBC Asian Network is transmitted for Peterborough and North Cambs on 1449 kHz from the Gunthorpe, Peterborough mast. This was originally BBC Radio Cambridgeshire's AM frequency for Peterborough.

In addition, BBC Radio Cambridgeshire also broadcasts on Freeview TV channel 722 in the BBC East region and streams online via BBC Sounds.

On 10 May 2021, BBC Radio Cambridgeshire ceased broadcasting on Medium Wave.

Programming
Local programming is produced and broadcast from the BBC's Cambridge studios from 6am – 10pm on weekdays, from 6am – 6pm and 8-10pm on Saturdays and from 6am – 2pm and 6-10pm on Sundays.

Off-peak programming, including the late show from 10pm – 1am, originates from sister stations BBC Radio Suffolk, BBC Three Counties Radio, BBC Radio Norfolk, BBC Radio Northampton and BBC Essex.

During the station's downtime, BBC Radio Cambridgeshire simulcasts overnight programming from BBC Radio 5 Live and BBC Radio London.

Former presenters

 Chris Morris 
 Matthew Amroliwala
 Dr Chris Smith
 Richard Spendlove

Naked Scientists 
BBC Cambridgeshire is also the home of multi award-winning science programme The Naked Scientists, a group of Cambridge University doctors and researchers with a passion for making science fun. They strip down science and lay the facts bare every Sunday evening, inviting listeners to call in and talk science. They are joined in the studio by a succession of guest scientists who talk about their work and take questions live from the audience. The current series of The Naked Scientists launched in October 2005.

The Naked Scientists is supported by a website, which contains archived editions of their previous programmes in streamed and podcast formats. Archiving their radio programmes online in this way, in 2005 the Naked Scientists were the first BBC local radio programme to co-exist as a podcast in the iTunes music store.

Between 2003 and 2012 the Naked Scientists was broadcast across the BBC East region comprising eight local BBC radio stations in the east of England. From January 2013, the programme has aired on Sunday evenings on BBC Radio Cambridgeshire. The Naked Scientists team also provide day-to-day support for science coverage in mid-week programmes on the station. The name of the programme is a nod to Jamie Oliver, a cook whose television programme is called the Naked Chef, who grew up in Clavering to the south east of Cambridge.

References

External links 
 
 History of local radio in Cambridgeshire
 The Naked Scientists
 BBC Radio Peterborough's Steve Somers
 BBC Radio Peterborough's Darren Deans
 Tony Martin visits the station

Audio clips 
 2001 jingle
 The A14 Song

Cambridgeshire
Radio stations established in 1982
Culture in Cambridgeshire
Organisations based in Cambridge
Radio stations in Cambridgeshire and Peterborough
1982 establishments in England